Durgadas Bhatia (29 August 1907 – 1972) was an Indian politician belonging to the Indian National Congress. He was elected to the Lok Sabha, lower house of the Parliament of India from Amritsar in Punjab.

References

External links
Official biographical sketch in Lok Sabha website

1907 births
Lok Sabha members from Punjab, India
India MPs 1971–1977
Indian National Congress politicians
1972 deaths
Indian National Congress politicians from Punjab, India